KMRC 1430 AM is a radio station airing a swamp pop format, licensed to Morgan City, Louisiana.  KMRC is one of the few stations currently programming swamp pop.  The station broadcasts during daytime hours only, and is owned by Spotlight Broadcasting of New Orleans, LLC.

References

External links
 KMRC's official website

Radio stations in Louisiana
Daytime-only radio stations in Louisiana